According to the Hebrew Bible, Micah ( Mīḵā hamMōraštī "Micah the Morashtite"), also known as Micheas, was a prophet in Judaism and is the author of the Book of Micah. He is considered one of the Twelve Minor Prophets of the Hebrew Bible and was a contemporary of the prophets Isaiah, Amos and Hosea. Micah was from Moresheth-Gath, in southwest Judah. He prophesied during the reigns of kings Jotham, Ahaz, and Hezekiah of Judah.

Micah's messages were directed chiefly toward Jerusalem. He prophesied the future destruction of Jerusalem and Samaria, the destruction and then future restoration of the Judean state, and he rebuked the people of Judah for dishonesty and idolatry.

 is interpreted by Christians as a prophecy that Bethlehem, a small village just south of Jerusalem, would be the birthplace of the Messiah.

Biblical narrative
Micah was active in Judah from before the fall of Israel in 722 BC and experienced the devastation brought by Sennacherib's invasion of Judah in 701 BC. He prophesied from approximately 737 to 696 BC. Micah was from Moresheth, also called Moresheth-Gath, a small town in southwest Judah. Micah lived in a rural area, and often rebuked the corruption of city life in Israel and Judah. The subject's father is not given and likely descended from the common people as the target of his message was towards the privileged classes.

Micah prophesied during the reigns of kings Jotham, Ahaz, and Hezekiah of Judah. Jotham, the son of Uzziah, was king of Judah from 742 to 735 BC, and was succeeded by his own son Ahaz, who reigned over Judah from 735 to 715 BC. Ahaz's son Hezekiah ruled from 715 to 696 BC. Micah was a contemporary of the prophets Isaiah, Amos, and Hosea. Jeremiah, who prophesied about thirty years after Micah, recognized Micah as a prophet from Moresheth who prophesied during the reign of Hezekiah.

Message
His messages were directed mainly towards Jerusalem, and were a mixture of denunciations and prophecies.  In his early prophecies, he predicted the destruction of both Samaria and Jerusalem for their respective sins. The people of Samaria were rebuked for worshipping idols which were bought with the income earned by prostitutes. Micah was the first prophet to predict the downfall of Jerusalem. According to him, the city was doomed because its beautification was financed by dishonest business practices, which impoverished the city's citizens. He also called to account the prophets of his day, whom he accused of accepting money for their oracles.

Micah also anticipated the destruction of the Judean state and promised its restoration more glorious than before. He prophesied an era of universal peace over which the Governor will rule from Jerusalem. Micah also declared that when the glory of Zion and Jacob is restored that the  will force the Gentiles to abandon idolatry.

Micah also rebuked Israel because of dishonesty in the marketplace and corruption in government. He warned the people, on behalf of God, of pending destruction if ways and hearts were not changed. He told them what the  requires of them:

Another prophecy given by Micah details the future destruction of Jerusalem and the plowing of Zion (a part of Jerusalem). This passage (Micah 3:11–12), is stated again in Jeremiah 26:18, Micah's only prophecy repeated in the Old Testament. Since then Jerusalem has been destroyed three times, the first one being the fulfillment of Micah's prophecy. The Babylonians destroyed Jerusalem in 586 BC, about 150 years after Micah gave this prophecy.

Christian interpretation

 is interpreted as a prophecy that Bethlehem, a small village just south of Jerusalem, would be the birthplace of the Messiah.

In  Jesus adapts  to his own situation;

Micah was referring to the division in Judah and Samaria, the distrust that had arisen between all citizens, even within families. Jesus was using the same words to describe something different. Jesus said that he did not come to bring peace, but to divide households. Men are commanded to love Jesus Christ more than their own family members, and Jesus indicated that this priority would lead to persecution from others and separation within families.

In Micah 7:20, Micah reminded Judah of God's covenant to be merciful to Jacob and show love to Abraham and his descendants. This is repeated in Luke 1:72–73 in the prophecy Zechariah at the circumcision and naming of John the Baptist. This prophecy concerned the kingdom and salvation through the Messiah. It is a step in the fulfillment of the blessing of the descendants of Abraham. When Micah restated this covenant promise, he was comforting Judah with the promise of God's faithfulness and love.

Micah's prophecy to King Hezekiah is mentioned in Jeremiah 26:17-19:

17 Then certain of the elders of the land rose up and spoke to all the assembly of the people, saying: 18 “Micah of Moresheth prophesied in the days of Hezekiah king of Judah, and spoke to all the people of Judah, saying, ‘Thus says the Lord of hosts:

“Zion shall be plowed like a field,
Jerusalem shall become heaps of ruins,
And the mountain of the temple[a]
Like the bare hills of the forest.”’[b]
19 Did Hezekiah king of Judah and all Judah ever put him to death? Did he not fear the Lord and seek the Lord’s favor? And the Lord relented concerning the doom which He had pronounced against them. But we are doing great evil against ourselves.”

Liturgical commemoration
Micah is commemorated with the other eleven minor prophets in the Calendar of Saints (Armenian Apostolic Church) on July 31. In the Eastern Orthodox Church he is commemorated twice in the year. The first feast day is January 5 (for those churches which follow the traditional Julian Calendar, January 5 currently falls on January 18 of the modern Gregorian Calendar). However, since January 5 is also the eve of the Great Feast of Theophany (in the west, Epiphany) and a strict fast day (near total abstinence from food and non-religious activities), his major celebration is on August 14 (the forefeast of the Great Feast of the Dormition of the Mother of God).

References

Bibliography
 Delbert R. Hillers, Micah (Minneapolis, Fortress Press, 1984) (Nurse). 
 Bruce K. Waltke, A Commentary on Micah (Grand Rapids, Eerdmans, 2007).
 Mignon Jacobs, Conceptual Coherence of the Book of Micah (Sheffield, Sheffield Academic Press, 2009).
 Yair Hoffman Engel, "The Wandering Lament: Micah 1:10–16," in Mordechai Cogan and Dan`el Kahn (eds), Treasures on Camels' Humps: Historical and Literary Studies from the Ancient Near East Presented to Israel Eph`al (Jerusalem, Magnes Press, 2008).

External links

Prophet Micah Orthodox icon and synaxarion for August 14
Historical and Literary Overview

8th-century BC people
Christian saints from the Old Testament
Book of Micah